Bothriochloa bladhii (commonly called, variously, Australian bluestem, Caucasian bluestem, forest-bluegrass, plains bluestem, and purple plume grass) is a Neotropic grass in the family Poaceae, found primarily in tropical Africa, and tropical and temperate Asia, and Australia. The type specimen was collected from China by Finnish botanist Peter Johan Bladh. The name of Bladh is honored in the specific epithet.

Distribution
Bothriochloa bladhii is native to Africa from Senegal and Ethiopia southwards to South Africa;  the Middle East; much of temperate and tropical, southern and eastern Asia, Malesia, and Australia  .

Bothriochloa bladhii has also become naturalized elsewhere in the neotropics.

Uses
Bothriochloa bladhii is used as stored food for local livestock, and as a grazing plant by both livestock and wild ruminants. It is sometimes planted as a revegetator, to restore disturbed land.

References

External links
GrassBase page for Bothriochloa bladhii
Picture of Bothriochloa bladhii from the Hawaiian Ecosystems at Risk project (HEAR) website, courtesy of the Bishop Museum, Herbarium Pacificum

bladhii
Grasses of Africa
Grasses of Asia
Grasses of China
Grasses of India
Grasses of New Zealand
Grasses of Pakistan
Grasses of Russia
Flora of Indo-China
Flora of East Tropical Africa
Flora of Southern Africa
Flora of South Tropical Africa
Flora of temperate Asia
Flora of Afghanistan
Flora of Armenia
Flora of Azerbaijan
Flora of Bhutan
Flora of Burkina Faso
Flora of Cameroon
Flora of the Democratic Republic of the Congo
Flora of Ethiopia
Flora of Ghana
Flora of Iran
Flora of Japan
Flora of the Ryukyu Islands
Flora of Kazakhstan
Flora of Kyrgyzstan
Flora of Malesia
Flora of Nepal
Flora of Nigeria
Flora of Papua New Guinea
Flora of Senegal
Flora of Sri Lanka
Flora of Taiwan
Flora of Anhui
Flora of Fujian
Flora of Guangdong
Flora of Guangxi
Flora of Guizhou
Flora of Hubei
Flora of Hunan
Flora of Shaanxi
Flora of Sichuan
Flora of Xinjiang
Flora of Yunnan
Poales of Australia
Plants described in 1781